Elizabeth Hughes (March 19, 1875 - March 15, 1941) was an American educator and Republican Party politician who is most remembered as one of the four women first elected in 1918 to the California Legislature to serve in the 1919 session of the California State Assembly.

Family and early life
Elizabeth was married to James B. Hughes. They resided in Butte County, California where her husband was the principal of Oroville High School, and she taught school.

California legislator
In 1918 Elizabeth Hughes, along with Esto Bates Broughton, Grace S. Dorris, and Anna L. Saylor, was elected to serve in the 1919 California State Assembly. Hughes was chairwoman of the House Education Committee.

References

1875 births
1941 deaths
Women state legislators in California
Politicians from Oroville, California
Republican Party members of the California State Assembly
Schoolteachers from California
American women educators